Kele is a small town in the Amaro special woreda of Southern Nations, Nationalities, and Peoples Region, Ethiopia. It is situated about 400 km south of the capital Addis Ababa.

References

Populated places in the Southern Nations, Nationalities, and Peoples' Region